Werra Railway may refer to:

 Werra Railway Company, a former railway company in Germany
 Eisenach–Lichtenfels railway, Werra Railway Company's trunk line along Werra river